Adelaide Croatia Raiders SC, formerly known as Adelaide Raiders and historically Adelaide Croatia, is a semi-professional soccer club based in Adelaide, South Australia, they currently plays in the South Australian State League 1. It is a Croatian Australian-backed club and its home ground is the Croatian Sports Centre in Gepps Cross, a northern suburb of Adelaide.

History
The Adelaide Croatia Soccer Club was founded in 1952 by a group of Croatian migrants who named the club after their homeland. The group included Fahrudin Cerić, the then President, Cvjetko Milanović and Drago Pišpek.

The club affiliated with the SASFA and played in the metropolitan division for five years. Its first game was against a team from the (now closed) Philips factory at Hendon. Its first home ground was in the South Parklands on Greenhill Rd.

In 1960 the club moved to its new headquarters at Hanson Reserve. It remained there until 2000, when it moved to the sporting complex at Gepps Cross.

The 1960s proved to be a successful decade for the club in the South Australian State League, finishing in third place in 1961, 1962 and 1963, while finishing Runner-Up in 1965 and 1969. Despite these strong results they didn't win first place first place in the South Australian State League until 1980. Since then Croatia has won the league on another four occasions: in 1984, 1988, 1997 and 2002.

In 1962 the club competed in the inaugural Australian Cup, the first nationwide club tournament held in Australia. Croatia Adelaide were one of 16 participants in the knock-out competition and were the first Croatian backed club to compete. The side lost its first round match, losing to Brunswick Juventus 3–1 at Melbourne's Olympic Park to see the club knocked out. The club would again compete in the Australian Cup twice more in 1963 and 1965.

The year 1977 saw the formation of the National Soccer League. Following the failure of Melbourne Croatia and Sydney Croatia in their applications for the league, Adelaide Croatia led a move backed by the Croatian Soccer Association of Australia which saw a proposal put forward for a Croatian 'super club' to enter the NSL; a club which would see the resources of all of Australia's Croatian clubs pooled together. Ultimately the submission failed.

A major highlight in the club's history came in 1985; as the champions of South Australia, Adelaide Croatia was invited to take part in the National Soccer League Cup. Adelaide Croatia had a remarkable run defeating both of Adelaide's NSL sides, Adelaide City and West Adelaide, 1–0 in the opening two rounds. The club lost in the quarter-finals to another NSL side, Sunshine George Cross. It was a valiant display seeing Croatia go down 1–0 in a tightly fought match.

Midway through the 2010 season John Kosmina who managed Adelaide United and Sydney FC in the A-League was announced as the new coach for the Raiders.

In 2013, the Raiders made the finals series of the FFSA Premier League following a fifth placed league finish. The finals run came to a quick end after going down to Campbelltown City on penalties at the first hurdle.

The Raiders narrowly avoided relegation in the 2015 season, finishing above relegated sides Port Adelaide Lion and Modbury Jets on goal difference alone, with all three sides finishing the season with 27 points.

Prior to the start of the 2016 season, former international striker Joel Porter was announced as the new head coach, but they parted ways only nine rounds into the NPLSA season, with the club languishing in bottom place. Although Porter was replaced by former Raiders player Robert Matosevic, they finished bottom of the league and were relegated to the 2017 State League 1. 

In 2018 they earned promotion back in to the NPL by reaching the 2nd division play-off series final against the minor premiers Adelaide Blue Eagles.

In 2021 the club reintroduced "Croatia" back into its name, after the new policy released from Football Australia which allows clubs to revert to their traditional names and symbols.

Current squad

Honours
South Australian Champions: 1980, 1984, 1988, 1997, 2002
South Australian Runner-Up: 1965, 1969, 1983, 1986, 1990, 1992, 1995, 2005, 2007
South Australian Minor-Premiers: 1997
South Australian Regular Season Runner-Up: 1992, 1995, 2005
Federation Cup Winners: 1960, 1962, 1974, 1977, 1982, 1988, 1990, 1991, 1992, 2003
Federation Cup Runner-Up: 1959, 1998, 2005
Errea Cup: 2007
Coca-Cola (Top 4) Cup Winners: 1984
Ampol Cup Winners: 1961, 1989, 1990
South Australian Division One Champions: 1959, 1972, 1975, 2018
Australian Croatian Soccer Tournament: 1984, 1995, 1997, 2002, 2009

Individual honours
Sergio Melta Medal – South Australian Player of the Year
1965 – Billy Graham
2004 – Richie Alagich
2006 – Michael Cartwright
2009 – Richie Alagich
2010 – Richie Alagich
2012 – Nicky Orr

See also
List of Croatian football clubs in Australia
Australian-Croatian Soccer Tournament
Croatian Australian

References

External links
 Official Website
 South Australian Croatian community

Croatian sports clubs in Australia
Raiders
National Premier Leagues clubs
Soccer clubs in South Australia
Association football clubs established in 1952
1952 establishments in Australia
Viking Age in popular culture